= Matto Kämpf =

Swiss writer and actor

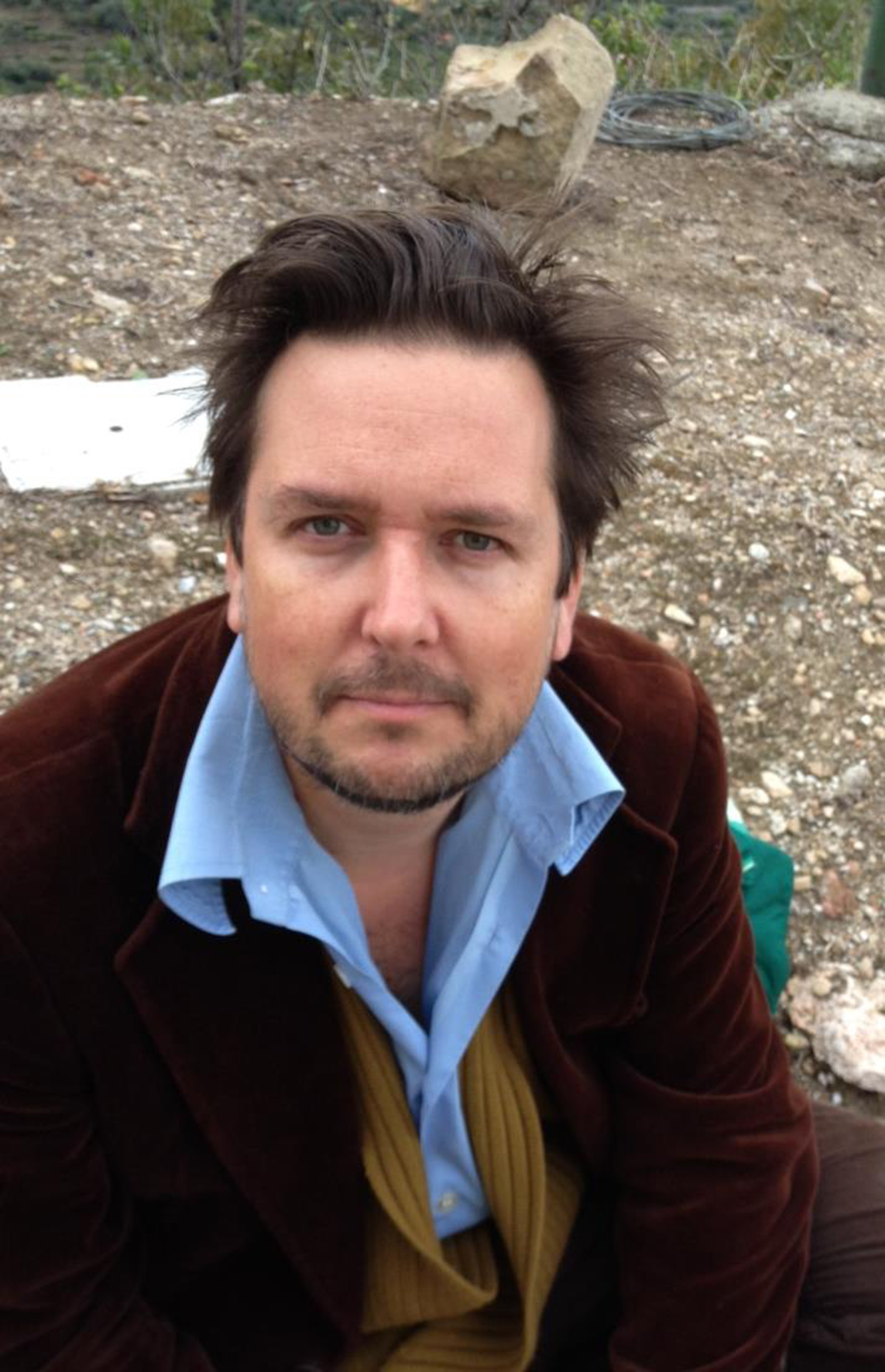
- Kampf in 2013
- Born: 1970 (age 55–56); Thun, Canton of Bern, Switzerland

Matto Kämpf (born 1970) is a Swiss writer and actor.

== Biography ==
Matto Kämpf was born in Thun in 1970․ He lives in Bern and is a member of Spoken Word-Trios Die Gebirgspoeten and «Quasi-Band» Trampeltier of Love.

He played Mr. Schneuwly in the Swiss Radio TV series Experiment Schneuwly in seasons 1 (2014), 2 (2015), and 3 (2018).

In 2016, Matto Kämpf shot his short film 4000. In the 2017 film Lasst die Alten sterben (Let the Old Folks Die), he had a supporting role as a neighbor. In the same year, he also starred in the film The Pitts Circus Family. As a guest, he appeared in the TV show Comedy aus dem Labor (August 12, 2012), in the talk show Aeschbacher (June 19, 2014), and in the comedy show Late Update (March 10, 2019).

== Prizes ==
- 2019 Weiterschreiben scholarship from the City of Bern
- 2024 Atelierstipendium in Genua der Stadt Thun

== Publications (selection) ==
=== Books ===
- Tiergeschichten. Der gesunde Menschenversand, Bern 2007, ISBN 978-3-9522993-8-8.
- Krimi. Der gesunde Menschenversand, Luzern 2009, ISBN 978-3-905825-12-1.
- Der Rabenvater. Der gesunde Menschenversand, Luzern 2010, ISBN 978-3-905825-25-1.
- Tiergeschichten 2. Der gesunde Menschenversand, Luzern 2011, ISBN 978-3-905825-34-3.
- Kanton Afrika: Eine Erbauungsschrift Der gesunde Menschenversand, Luzern 2014, ISBN 978-3-905825-78-7.
- mit Yves Noyau: Tierweg 1. Kinderbuch. Der gesunde Menschenversand, Luzern 2014, ISBN 978-3-905825-89-3.
- Heute Ruhetag. Illustrierten «Sammelsurium» mit Reportagen aus Varanasi, Kairo und Stockholm. Der gesunde Menschenversand, Luzern 2016, ISBN 978-3-03853-023-7.
- Tante Leguan. Roman. Der gesunde Menschenversand, Luzern 2018, ISBN 978-3-03853-077-0.
- mit Yves Noyau: D Chatz isch zur Sou. Kinderbuch. Der gesunde Menschenversand, Luzern 2019, ISBN 978-3-03853-098-5.

=== Miscellaneous ===
- mit Yves Noyau: Isch es wahr? Postkartenset aus 12 Postkarten. Der gesunde Menschenversand, Luzern 2009, ISBN 978-3-905825-15-2.
- Kurzfilme 1995–2011. DVD. Der gesunde Menschenversand, Luzern 2011.
- Die Gebirgspoeten (Rolf Hermann, Matto Kämpf, Achim Parterre): Muff, Audio-CD, Der gesunde Menschenversand, Luzern 2012, ISBN 978-3-905825-44-2.
